Enumclaw High School is a public school in Enumclaw, Washington. The school serves about 1300 students from Enumclaw as well as local unincorporated regions of King County and cities such as Black Diamond and Greenwater. The school's mascot is the Hornet; its colors are maroon and gold.

Athletics 
Enumclaw High School sports teams compete in the Olympic Division of the North Puget Sound League, under the auspices of the WIAA, and previously competed in the SPSL 3A division. Its rival school's team is the White River High School Hornets. The Hornets were the 2008, 2009, 2011, 2012, and 2015 Washington state wrestling champions of division 3A.  The 2010 Boys Basketball team went on a 27–0 run before losing in the championship game to Union High School (Camas, Washington) by one point in the last 10 seconds of the game because of a controversial foul called sending a Union guard to the line. 1977 WIAA Baseball Champions. Enumclaw High School has also had success in gymnastics, with state titles in 2012 & 2013.

Enumclaw High School offers the following athletics:

Boys

Baseball, 
Basketball, 
Football, 
Golf, 
Soccer, 
Swim & Dive, 
Tennis, 
Track, 
Water Polo, 
Wrestling, 
X-Country,

Girls

Basketball, 
Golf, 
Gymnastics, 
Soccer, 
Softball-Fastpitch, 
Swim & Dive, 
Tennis, 
Track, 
Volleyball, 
Water Polo, 
Wrestling, 
X-Country,

CoEd

Unified Basketball, 
Unified Soccer

Theatre 
Enumclaw High School's theatre department operates at a high standard. The 5th Avenue theatre in downtown Seattle holds a 'High School Theatre' Awards show every year, much like the Tony Awards for Broadway. They award things such as 'Best Overall Musical Production,' and 'Best Performance By A Chorus' all the way through 'Best Costumes' and 'Best Program Design' to high school shows all over the western Washington area. In the 2006–2007 school year, Enumclaw High School's Theatre Department received three nominations from the 5th Avenue for their production of 'Chicago.' Those nominations were in the categories of 'Outstanding Orchestra,' 'Best Performance by a Small Ensemble—Cell Block Girls,' and 'Best Choreography.' A cast member commented, "The experience was one I will remember for the rest of my life."

Musicals 

 2006 – Bye Bye Birdie
 2007 – Chicago
 2008 – It's A Bird, It's A Plane, It's Superman! The Musical
 2009 – Titanic: The Musical
 2010 – Peter Pan
 2010 – Sweeney Todd
 2011 – The Drowsy Chaperone
 2012 – Les Misérables
 2013 – Legally Blonde
 2014 - Cabaret
 2015 - The Addams Family
 2016 - State Fair
 2017 - Urinetown
 2018 - Spamalot
 2019 - The 25th Annual Putnam County Spelling Bee
2020 - Hello, Dolly! (canceled due to Covid)
2021 - Alone Together (original show)
2022 - Little Shop of Horrors

Instrumental/Choir Program 
Paul Scott is the head of the music department at EHS and also directs the choir programs. Tim Hager-Wentz directs the band programs and Ainsley Holz directs the string programs.

Instrumental Awards 

 2019 - State champion for small percussion ensemble (The Pythagorean Brotherhood)

Marching Band 
The Enumclaw marching band is directed by Tim Hager-Wentz. .

Shows 

 2008 - Motown
 2013 - Salute to America
 2014 - Phantom of the Opera
 2015 - Skyrim
 2016 - Divergent 
 2017 - Invincible
 2018 - Rach and Roll
 2019 - Outside the Box

Awards

Auburn Veterans Day 2019 

 Parade: 1st Place, A Division
 Field Show: 1st Place, A Division
 Best Marching
 Best Percussion
 Best Music
 Best General Effect

Notable alumni 
T. R. Bryden (1977), high school state baseball champion and former MLB player (California Angels)
Kasey Kahne (1999), stock car racing driver with 18 NASCAR Cup series wins
Brian Scalabrine (1996), former basketball player for the New Jersey Nets, Chicago Bulls, and NBA Champion with the Boston Celtics (2008)
Tony Tost (1993), poet, critic, and screenwriter

References

External links 
Enumclaw High School website
Enumclaw School District website
Enumclaw Hornets website

High schools in King County, Washington
Public high schools in Washington (state)
Buildings and structures in Enumclaw, Washington
1961 establishments in Washington (state)